Greatest Hits is the third compilation/greatest hits album from Jars of Clay, that was released on April 1, 2008.  This compilation follows 2001's Jar of Gems, which was released to the Singapore market, and 2007's The Essential Jars of Clay.

Track listing
The album contains 14 tracks, 13 previously released and one new song, entitled "Love Is The Protest".

** Denotes new song exclusive to this album

References

2008 greatest hits albums
Jars of Clay compilation albums
Essential Records (Christian) compilation albums